The 9th constituency of the Seine-Maritime (French: Neuvième circonscription de la Seine-Maritime) is a French legislative constituency in the Seine-Maritime département. Like the other 576 French constituencies, it elects one MP using the two-round system, with a run-off if no candidate receives over 50% of the vote in the first round.

Description

The 9th Constituency of the Seine-Maritime includes the coast and some inland areas to the north and east of Le Havre. At the northern end of the constituency is the fishing port of Fécamp.

The seat has swung between left and right since 1988 broadly in line with the national picture. In 2017 keeping with this pattern the constituency elected the candidate of Emmanuel Macron's En Marche! party.

Assembly Members

Election results

2022

 
 
 
 
 
 
 
 
 
|-
| colspan="8" bgcolor="#E9E9E9"|
|-
 
 

 
 
 
 
 

* PRV dissident** LREM dissident

2017

 
 
 
 
 
 
 
 
|-
| colspan="8" bgcolor="#E9E9E9"|
|-

2012

 
 
 
 
 
|-
| colspan="8" bgcolor="#E9E9E9"|
|-

2007

 
 
 
 
 
 
 
|-
| colspan="8" bgcolor="#E9E9E9"|
|-

2002

 
 
 
 
 
 
 
|-
| colspan="8" bgcolor="#E9E9E9"|
|-

1997

 
 
 
 
 
 
 
|-
| colspan="8" bgcolor="#E9E9E9"|
|-

References

9